Western Boroughs was an electoral district for the Legislative Assembly in the Australian state of New South Wales from 1856 to 1859. It included the towns of Bathurst, Carcoar and Kelso, while the surrounding rural areas were in Bathurst (County) and Cook and Westmoreland. It was replaced by Bathurst and Carcoar.

Member for Western Boroughs

Election results

1856

1858

References

Former electoral districts of New South Wales
1856 establishments in Australia
1859 disestablishments in Australia